On May 18, 1948, the Egyptian Air Force bombed the Old Tel Aviv central bus station four days after Israel declared independence, killing 42 people.

The attack occurred during the 1948 Arab–Israeli War amid a bombing campaign by Egyptian forces in Tel Aviv that killed 150 people in total. The bombing occurred on May 18 when Egyptian C-47s launched an attack on the bus station, which was crowded with passengers at the time. The Palestine Post reported a "50-pound fragmentation bomb" shook the building. 42 people died in total, including four members of the Dan Bus Company. Over 100 people were injured.

The bus station was significantly damaged by the explosion, which was also the deadliest attack of its kind by the Egyptian Air Force. Many Israelis, especially residents of Tel Aviv, were outraged by the incident and called for the Israeli Air Force to bomb Egypt in retaliation. The bombing also convinced many pilots, including Lou Lenart, to join the war on behalf of Israel.

See also 

 History of Tel Aviv
 Killings and massacres during the 1948 Palestine war

References 

May 1948 events in Asia
1948 Arab–Israeli War
Egyptian war crimes
20th-century mass murder in Israel
Tel_Aviv_bus_station_bombing
Airstrikes in Asia
Egypt–Israel military relations
Attacks on bus stations
Murder in Tel Aviv
Attacks on buildings and structures in the 1940s
Attacks on buildings and structures in Tel Aviv
1940s in Tel Aviv